J. Scott Burgeson (born 1967) is an American author and teacher based in South Korea. He has authored four bestsellers in South Korea. Burgeson graduated with honors from the University of California, Berkeley in 1991 in English and Rhetoric. He was critic for the San Francisco Bay Guardian, the East Bay Express and the Daily Californian from 1990 to 1994 before relocating to Osaka, Japan, in 1994, and he wrote for Giant Robot, Kyoto Journal, Tokyo Journal, Kansai Time and PLAYBOY JAPAN. Before that he moved to Seoul, South Korea in 1996, his writing has appeared in Newsweek Korea, The Korea Times, The Korea Herald and Cine21. He was also a regular columnist for Maxim Korea and Chosun Ilbo.

Works
 Maximum Korea (1999) 
 Nasty Korean Studies (2002)
 Korea Bug: The Best of the Zine that Infected a Nation (2005) 
 Korea Consumer Report (2005)
More Nasty Korean Studies (2009)
Waygooks: Stories From Korea (2010)

References 

Living people
1967 births
Writers from Lincoln, Nebraska
American expatriates in South Korea
Date of birth missing (living people)